Communication Service for the Deaf (CSD) is a global social impact organization founded in 1975 by Benjamin Soukup. CSD provides technologies, resources, and services that benefit the deaf and hard of hearing community.

CSD is made up of several divisions that are each focused on meeting different needs within the deaf community. These include interpreting and customer service platforms, job training, educational resources, engineering insights and services, advocacy, and business development support.

Communication Service for the Deaf is a virtual company with 1,000 employees located across the United States. CEO, Christopher Soukup is a third-generation deaf person who took on the role of CEO after his father, Benjamin, retired.

Mission 
CSD is a deaf-led social impact organization with the mission of identifying and cultivating opportunities for deaf people to achieve success through multiple approaches: service delivery, communication solutions, innovation engineering, impact investing, and community building.

History 
 1975: CSD was founded when it began providing sign language interpreting services in Sioux Falls, South Dakota.
 1981: CSD began providing a 24-hour Telecommunications Relay Service(TRS) in Sioux Falls, South Dakota.
 1982: Established a community education program focused on independent living, employment services and drug/alcohol education and advocacy.
 1986: Established a job training program.
 1992: CSD partners with Sprint to expand Telecommunications Relay Services.
 1999: CSD Initiates Video Relay Service(VRS) and Video Remote Interpreting(VRI) Trials in South Dakota.
 2000: Supported the establishment of a domestic violence program in Minnesota.
 2004: CSD partners with America Online(AOL) to provide deaf-friendly customer support to AOL members.
 2009: FCC grants CSD $1.1 million to implement an awareness campaign about the transition to digital television (DTV).
 2010: US Dept. Of Commerce – National Telecommunication and Information Administration grants CSD with a $14.9 million contract for nationwide broadband and equipment deployment.
 2011: CSD launches nationwide TRS, CapTel, VRS, VRI and equipment distribution services in New Zealand.
 2017: CSD launches the CSD Social Venture Fund to cultivate deaf-owned enterprises.

References

External links 
 Communication Service for the Deaf Website
Deafness organizations
Videotelephony